County Line is the fourth studio album by American country music group Southern Pacific. It was released in 1990 via Warner Bros. Records. The album includes the singles "Any Way the Wind Blows", "Time's Up" "I Go to Pieces" and "Reckless Heart".

Track listing

Chart performance

References

1990 albums
Southern Pacific (band) albums
Albums produced by Jim Ed Norman
Warner Records albums